Anna Sergeyevna Shibanova (born 10 November 1994) is a Russian ice hockey defenseman and member of the Russian national team, currently serving as an alternate captain of Agidel Ufa in the Zhenskaya Hockey League (ZhHL).

She has represented Russia at six IIHF Women's World Championships, winning bronze medals at the tournaments in 2013 and 2016, and won gold in the women's ice hockey tournaments at the Winter Universiades in 2017 and 2019.

Her twin sister Tatyana is also an ice hockey player.

International career
Shibanova was selected for the Russia women's national ice hockey team in the 2014 Winter Olympics. She played in all six games, recording two assists.

In December 2017, Shibanova and seven other members of the 2014 Russian Olympic ice hockey squad were sanctioned for doping violations as part of the Oswald Commission. The team’s results were retroactively disqualified and the players banned for life by the International Olympic Committee (IOC). All eight players filed appeals with the Court of Arbitration for Sport (CAS) and the cases of five were overturned on appeal but violations were confirmed in the cases of Shibanova, Inna Dyubanok, and Galina Skiba and their disqualifications upheld, however, the lifetime ban from the Olympic Games was reduced to a ban from the 2018 Winter Olympics only.

Shibanova made three appearances for the Russia women's national under-18 ice hockey team, at the IIHF World Women's U18 Championships, with the first in 2010.

Career statistics

International

References

External links

1994 births
Living people
Sportspeople from Omsk
Russian women's ice hockey defencemen
HC Agidel Ufa players
Ice hockey players at the 2014 Winter Olympics
Ice hockey players at the 2022 Winter Olympics
Olympic ice hockey players of Russia
Doping cases in ice hockey
Russian sportspeople in doping cases
Sportspeople banned for life
Twin sportspeople
Russian twins
Universiade gold medalists for Russia
Universiade medalists in ice hockey
Competitors at the 2017 Winter Universiade
Competitors at the 2019 Winter Universiade
20th-century Russian women
21st-century Russian women